Pulsatilla Pass Is a pass located in Banff National Park. As the sources for both Johnston Creek, and Wildflower Creek  it is located near the Sawback Range between Johnston Canyon and Lake Louise, Alberta. 

At 2362m, the pass was named for a sub-generic name for one section of the genus of the Pulsatilla (Western Anemone) or Anemone occidentalis which grow in the area.

References

Banff National Park
Mountain passes of Alberta
Canadian Rockies